The Dominguez Hills are a low mountain range in the Transverse Ranges, in southern Los Angeles County, California. They are named for the locally prominent Californio family of Manuel Dominguez, which owned Rancho San Pedro.

They are between the Baldwin Hills and Palos Verdes Peninsula.

See also
1910 Los Angeles International Air Meet at Dominguez Field
California State University, Dominguez Hills
Manuel Dominguez
Rancho San Pedro
Dominguez Rancho Adobe
Battle of Dominguez Rancho
Rancho Dominguez, California

References 

Mountain ranges of Los Angeles County, California
Transverse Ranges
Hills of California
Carson, California
South Bay, Los Angeles
Mountain ranges of Southern California